The Urrbrae Wetland is a constructed urban wetland in the Australian state of South Australia located in the suburb of Urrbrae in the Adelaide metropolitan area. It was constructed to manage flood water from the nearby Adelaide Hills and has been developed to provide ecological and educational benefits. The wetland covers approximately 6 hectares of land which is onsite  of Urrbrae Agricultural High School. The area of water is approximately 4 hectares and when full, contains approximately 13.5 million litres of water.

Description 

The wetland consists of four ponds: the main pond, two sedimentation ponds and the farm dam.  The main pond is clay lined and is designed to be kept filled to prevent drying out and cracking.  The farm dam is synthetic lined and is used to top up the main dam when water levels are low.  In an average year about 400 million litres of storm water passes through the wetland each year.   When the wetland is full it contains about 13.5 million litres of water from a catchment of approximately 380 hectares.
Although it is not a true wetland, it serves a useful function in the cleansing of the stormwater via natural cleaning process including:

 The water flow is slowed down
 Sand and other sediments fall to the bottom
 Heavy metals, salts, bacteria et ‘stick’ onto the falling sand particles
 Reeds, sedges and other plants along the shores filter out much of the salts and heavy metals.

Leaf litter, plastic bags and other debris is removed by trash removal systems at the entry to the sedimentation ponds to aid in cleansing of the water. 
The cleansed water then travels via storm water pipes to Brown Hill Creek and to the sea. This process is arranged and funded by the City of Mitcham.  In 2011 construction began on pipes and facilities for some of the water to be pumped to tanks at the High School and used for watering grounds during summer months.

History 
In July 1993 the City of Mitcham and the Urrbrae Agricultural High School were independently investigating a wetland project.  Mitcham Council was seeking to alleviate a long-standing flooding problem, while the school wanted to address regular flooding on its farmland and to broaden its environmental studies curriculum.
Work on the project to construct the Urrbrae detention basin that would store the excess water commenced in June 1996 and finished in December 1996. It cost $1.2m, contributed by the City of Mitcham, the SA Department of Transport and the [Patawalonga River | Patawalonga] Catchment Water Management Board.  The Education Department provided the land that was originally bequeathed to the State of South Australia for educational use by Peter Waite, a prominent pastoralist of the early 20th century.
In August 1997 the organisation, The Friends of the Urrbrae Wetland, was established, sponsored initially by the Rotary Club, Mitcham.  The chief activity of the Friends is to establish, as far as possible, the native vegetation which existed prior to European settlement, and which is generally known as grey box woodland, Eucalyptus microcarpa. The Friends meet weekly for environmental improvement tasks including planting and weeding.

Ecosystem

Plants

The native vegetation which existed prior to European settlement, and now found in the wetland, is generally known as grey box woodland. This ecological community is now classified as 'threatened' by the Australian Government Department of Sustainability, Environment, Water, Population and Communities.

Grey box woodland

The grey box woodland consists mainly of Eucalyptus microcarpa, commonly known as the "grey box" due to its bark colour, which was a dominant species on the southern Adelaide Plains.  Over the years the Friends have planted over one hundred indigenous terrestrial and aquatic plant species to maximise diversity, habitat and serve as a resource for other revegetation projects.

For example,
 Canopy plants: Grey box (Eucalyptus microcarpa), river red gum (Eucalyptus camaldulensis), South Australian blue gum (Eucalyptus leucoxylon)) and drooping sheoak (Allocasuarina verticillata), Callitris gracilis and native apricot
 Shrubs including five different varieties of acacias or wattles, Bursaria spinosa, sticky hop bush, Dodonaea viscosa
 Under-story plants including several varieties of saltbrush, eutaxia, vittadinia daisies, lilies and many varieties of native grasses.

Plants that grow well in the Wetland
The plants listed below grow well at the Urrbrae Wetland as identified in March 2013.

Aquatic animals

Water based animals include four frog species and over fifty macro invertebrate species, Murray River rainbowfish and common yabby.

Birds

The permanent water in the wetland, its adjacent habitats and a reliable feed source, have attracted many species of waterbirds to this site. Commonly seen birds are Pacific black duck hybrids, Australian wood duck, Australasian grebe, Eurasian coot. Some rarely seen birds are sacred kingfisher, and the little lorikeet.

With the presence of maturing nectar bearing and insect attracting flora, an increasing number of bush birds can also be seen in the different seasons. For example, when the eucalyptus are flowering the New Holland honeyeater, musk lorikeet and rainbow lorikeet are frequent visitors. Breeding of some species is occurring in the Wetland, including the, dusky moorhen, Eurasian coot, Australasian grebe, clamorous reed warbler, magpie-lark, willie wagtail, crested pigeon and spotted turtle dove.

Education

School and tertiary education

The wetland has a classroom with laboratory facilities and visual aids providing a major learning centre for the Urrbrae Agricultural High School and TAFE (Technical and Further Education) students on the nearby school campus.  The school funds the position of a Science Teacher-Manager permanently on site.  It is also used by other schools and community groups who come to the centre to learn about the role of wetland.  Each year about 10,000 students visit the wetland.

Community education

The Friends of the Urrbrae Wetland is a volunteer group that meets weekly to help maintain the Wetland and offers two public Open Days a year which include a talk and guided walk.  A focus of these talks and walks is the reestablishment of the Grey Box Woodland.

References

External links

 Urrbrae Wetland Learning Centre
 Friends of Urrbrae Wetland 
 The Birdie Project
 Urrbrae Wetland, Urrbrae Agricultural High School
 ABC Television overview of the wetland  Sept 2012, video 3 min 

Wetlands of South Australia
Environment of South Australia
Geography of Adelaide
Constructed wetlands in Australia